Archery was contested from October 6 to October 10 at the 2002 Asian Games at the Gangseo Archery Field, in Busan, South Korea.

The competition included only recurve events. South Korea won both team gold medals. Hiroshi Yamamoto of Japan won the men's individual title while Yuan Shu-chi from Chinese Taipei won the women's gold medal.

Schedule

Medalists

Medal table

Participating nations
A total of 101 athletes from 19 nations competed in archery at the 2002 Asian Games:

References
 2002 Asian Games official website
 Results

 
2002 Asian Games events
2002
Asian Games
2002 Asian Games